Jamnagar is a city located on the western coast of India in the state of Gujarat of Saurashtra region. It is the administrative headquarters of the Jamnagar district and the fifth largest city in Gujarat.

India's largest private company, Reliance Industries, has established the world's largest Oil Refining and Petrochemicals Complex in Jamnagar district.

History 

Nawanagar was founded by Jam Rawal in 1540 as the capital of the eponymous princely state. Jamnagar, historically known as Nawanagar (the new town), was one of the most important and the largest princely states of the Jadejas in the Saurashtra region.vIt was a thirteen-gun salute state.

According to historical records, Bahadur Shah, Sultan of Gujarat bestowed upon Jam Lakhaji twelve villages in recognition of his role in the siege of Pawagadh. Shortly after he took possession of the villages, Jam Lakhaji was killed by his cousins, Tamachi Deda and Jam Hamir Jadeja. His son, Jam Rawal, murdered his father's killers and became ruler of Kutch. The State of Kutch was semi-independent from the Gujarat Sultanate.

Hamirji's sons, Khengarji and Sahibji, served the Sultan of Gujarat. During a hunt, the brothers saved the Sultan from being killed by a lion. As a reward for their valour, the Sultan sent an army with them to regain their kingdom. Jam Rawal prepared for battle after hearing that the two princes were returning to Kutch with the imperial army.

Goddess Ashapuraji, the supreme deity of the Jadeja Clan of Rajputs, appeared to Jam Rawal in a dream. She told him that although he had broken an oath taken in her name not to kill Hamirji, she had refrained from punishing him because he had previously honoured her. She said that Jam Rawal was no longer to dwell in Kutch.

As Jam Rawal and his entourage marched out of Kutch, they attacked and killed Tamachi Deda, the main conspirator in the murder of Jam Lakhaji. Jam Rawal also conquered the town of Amran and its dependencies, bestowing the rule of Dhrol province on his younger brother Hardholji. Hardholji died in battle at Mithoi near Khambhalia, passing the throne to his eldest son Jasoji. Jam Rawal conquered parts of Saurashtra and formed his kingdom with 999 villages named Halar.

While on a hunting trip in present-day Jamnagar, Jam Rawal's hunting dogs were scared by a hare brave enough to turn on them. Jam Rawal thought that if this land could breed such hares, the men born here would be superior to other men. As a result, he made this place his capital.

On the seventh day of the bright half of the month of Shrawan, V.S.1956 (August 1540) on the banks of the Rangmati and Nagmati rivers, Jam Rawal laid the foundation of his new capital and named it Nawanagar (new town). After a few centuries, its name changed to Jamnagar or the Town of the JAMs.

Jamsaib was instrumental in creating the city's modern infrastructure during his reign in the 1920s. Jam Saheb Shri Digvijaysinhji Ranjitsinhji expanded the city's development in the 1940s when it was part of the Princely state of Nawanagar.

Geography 
Major communities include the Jadeja, Charan (Gadhvi), Satvaras (Dalvadis), Ahirs Sagars, Patels, Bhanushalis, Rajputs, Mers, Jains, Lohanas, Brahmins, Bhoi (Bhoiraj), and Vaghers (Muslim and Hindu), and Khavas.  

There are two important ports close to Jamnagar. Rozi Port is on the shore of the Gulf of Kutch; Bedi Port is two nautical miles inland on the Rangamati River. Bedi Port is an all-weather intermediate seaport that exports various commodities, including bauxite, soya meal extracts, and ground nut extracts. The port's imports include coal, fertilizer, and other items. 

The coral reef island of Pirotan is one of the 42 islands which compose the Marine National Park. Pirotan lies in the Arabian Sea, 12 nautical miles off the coast, and stretches up to 

It features a seasonal freshwater shallow lake, inter-tidal mudflats, creeks, saltpans, saline land, and mangrove scrub. The place is a known breeding ground of the great crested grebe, the little grebe, purple moorhen, coot, black-winged stilt, and pheasant-tailed jiacana. Raptors, including harriers, eagles, hawks, and falcons also live here. The sanctuary also shelters migratory birds such as swallows, martins, wagtails, and waterfowl. 

Jamnagar has huge reserves of bauxite, with its mines contributing 95% of the total production in the state.

Climate 
Jamnagar has a hot semi-arid climate (Köppen: BSh). There are three defined seasons. The hot season lasts from March to May and is extremely hot and humid. Tropical cyclones sometimes affect the region during this period. The cool season is from October to February when it remains hot during the day but has negligible rainfall, low humidity, and cool nights.

Demographics 
According to the 2011 Indian census, Jamnagar's population was 479,920, with an urban agglomeration of 600,943. Jamnagar has an average literacy rate of 82.14%, higher than the national average of 74.04%. Its male literacy rate is 86.90%, and its female literacy rate is 77.05%. In Jamnagar, 10% of the population is under six years of age. Males constitute 53% of the population and females 47%. The urban development authority of Jamnagar is Jamnagar Area Development Authority (JADA).

Most residents of Jamnagar are Gujarati and speak the Gujarati language. A small portion of the population speaks the Kutchi language, which is written in the Gujarati script but not mutually intelligible with Gujarati. The Kathiawadi language, a colloquial dialect of Gujarati, is widely used for day-to-day communication.

Economy 

The local population has given up its ancestral fishing businesses and has adopted different jobs created by industrialization and the arrival of several giant companies. Approximately 10% of the city's population earns their income by producing and exporting traditional Bandhani cloth. Digjam runs a composite mill manufacturing worsted fabrics at Jamnagar. It has been a notable player in the worsted textile industry in India. 

Jamnagar was formerly known as the Brass City because it houses more than 5,000 large-scale and 10,000 small-scale workshops that manufacture brass items. Most workshops are in and around the industrial estates of Shankar Tekri, GIDC Phase-III, M P Shah Udhyognagar, and Dared GIDC-II Industrial estate. The workshops make brass parts and extruded rods for export. Jamnagar is the largest producer of brass items in India.

Jamnagar is known as the World's Oil City because it is home to the world's biggest oil refineries. The Jamnagar Refinery is a private-sector crude oil refinery owned by Reliance Industries Limited. The refinery was commissioned on 14 July 1999 and is the largest refinery in the world. Nayara Energy owns Vadinar Refinery. India's second-largest single-site refinery is at Vadinar, Gujarat. 

Jamnagar has base stations for the Indian Air Force, the Indian Army, and the Indian Navy. The city has a strategic location close to Pakistan. It also has sizable reserves of bauxite, with its mines contributing 95% of the total production in the state.

Arts and Culture

Religion 

Jamnagar has several temples, such as Sidhnath Mahadev Temple, Badri Kedar Nath, Nilkanth Mahadev Temple, and Bhid Bhanjan Mahadev Temple near the Town Hall and the Kashi Vishwanath Temple on the K.V. Road. It is also well known for its four marble Jain temples: Vardhman Shah's Temple, Raisi Shah's Temple, Sheth's Temple, and Vasupujya Swami's Temple. All of these temples date to between 1574 and 1622. There are more than 30 Jain Temples in Jamnagar. 

The Bala Hanuman Temple on the southeastern side of Ranmai Lake is known for the continuous chanting of the mantra "Sri Ram, Jai Ram, Jai Jai Ram". Starting on 1 August 1964, this chant continues for 24 hours a day, earning the temple a place in the Guinness Book of World Records. Thousands of devotees visit the temple every year. Bholeshwar Mahadev Temple holds a fair every year on Shravani Amas. During the holy month of Shravana, there are Hindu fairs on the dried river banks near Bohra Hajira.

Architecture

Bholeshwar Mahadev Temple 
The temple is on the bank of the Dhandhar River.

Bhujio Kotho 
Bhujio Kotho is on the bank of Lakhota Lake, near Khambhaliya Gate. This five-storey monument protected the city during invasions. On the first floor, there were guns placed in each direction. The walls have holes for rifles. The upper floor has awater tank with a dancing peacock on its peak. Unfortunately, in an earthquake in 2001 Bhujio Kotho partially collapsed.

Bohra Hajira 
The Bohra Hajira is a white marble mausoleum built by Jam Rawal in 1540. Also known as Mazar E Badri, it is the resting place of the Muslim saint Mota Bawa. Bohra Hajira is on the banks of the Nagmati and Rangmati Rivers. The mausoleum is of Saracenic style and features intricate carvings.

Darbargadh 
Darbargadh (Maharajah's palace), the old royal residence of Jam Saheb and the most important historical complex in Jamnagar, reflects the fusion of Rajput and European styles of architecture. The semi-circular palace complex has several buildings with stone carvings, wall paintings, fretwork jali screens, ornamental mirrors, carved pillars, and sculptures. The exterior walls have carved jharokha balconies in the Indian tradition, a carved gate, and Venetian-Gothic arches. The earthquake in 2001 caused significant damage to Darbargadh.

Jamnagar Trimandir 
Jamnagar Trimandir is a two-storey structure with a large hall on the ground floor and a temple on the first floor.

Khambhaliya Gate 
Wazir Meraman Khawa built Khambhaliya Gate in the 17th century. It is one of two remaining city gates from that period.

Lakhota Palace 
Lakhota Palace is located on an island in the middle of Lakhota Lake. It once belonged to the Maharaja of Nawanagar. This small fort-like palace has semi-circular bastions, turrets, a pavilion with guard-rooms housing swords, powder flasks, and musket loops. An arched stone bridge with a balustrade connects the Lakhota Palace with the town.

Mota Ashapura Maa Temple 
Mota Ashapura Maa Temple is located in the east part of Jamnagar where the entrance gate leads into the old city area. The Jadeja clan built the temple for its patron goddess, (Kuldevi).

Navtanpuri Dham 
Shri Navtanpuri Dham was founded by Nijanand Swami Shri Devchandreji in 1630. Previously this holy place was a garden. According to Pranami Vitak-tradition, Shri Devchandraji entered the garden and used a Khijda tree twig to clean his teeth. He then broke the twig into two pieces that he planted into the ground. Over time, the twigs grew into two trees that are still attached to the shrine. Due to this legend, the temple is also called Khijada Mandir.

Pratap Vilas Palace 
Pratap Vilas Palace, built during the rule of His Royal Highness Ranjitsinhji, features European architectural style with Indian carvings. It is an imitation of the Victoria Memorial Building in Calcutta, but its domes are in the tradition of Indian architecture. Three of the domes are glass. The palace's columns feature carvings of creepers, flowers, leaves, birds, and animals. The 2001 earthquake caused a costly loss of some damage to its parapets and the separation of some upper walls at the roof level in some corners.

Saifee Tower 
The architect Syedna Taher Saifuddin built Saifee Tower in 1922. It features a clock in the central, tallest section of the tower.

Shantinath Mandir 
The Shantinath Mandir is southwest of Bedi Gate in Jamnagar. The temple has intricate carvings and walls adorned with murals depicting the lives of Jain saints. The floor is made of marble and decorated with distinctive Jain patterns in yellow, black, white, and red. Shantinatha, a 16th Tirthankara in Jainism, is the temple's namesake.

Solarium 
Also known as the Ranjit Institute of Poly-Radio Therapy, the Solarium was designed by French architect Jean Saidman for Jam Shri Ranjitsinhji. This slowly revolving tower provided full daylong sunlight to treat skin diseases. With the destruction of two similar solaria in France during World War II, this is probably now the only one of its kind in the world, certainly in Asia. Because of advancements in medicine and treatment, it is now obsolete and not in working condition.

Vardhman Shah's Temple 
Vardhman Shah's Temple is one of the main Jain temples in Jamnagar. Its shrine is dedicated to Adinathji, the first Tirthankara of Jainism. Its construction started in 1612, during the reign of Jam Jasaji I, and was completed in 1620. In 1622, devotees built 52 small deri or temples around the main building

Willingdon Crescent 
Willingdon Crescent was constructed by Ranjit Singh to replace a slum area. Inspired by Singh's European travels, it is an arcade of cusped arches, bigger on the ground floor and smaller on the upper storey. It has pilasters on the curving walls and balusters on the parapet. There is a  statue of Jam Saheb in the center of the crescent. The 2001 Gujarat earthquake caused slight damage to this shopping area.

Sports 
Cricket is a major sport in Jamnagar. A number of Indian Test cricketers hail from Jamnagar, including Vinoo Mankad, Indrajitsinhji, Ajay Jadeja, and Ravindra Jadeja. HH Shri Jam Ranjitsinji built the Ajitsinhji Pavilion cricket ground in 1908. The Ranji Trophy and Duleep Trophy Indian cricket competitions were named in memory of the princes of Jamnagar.

The municipal corporation built the sports complex with a swimming pool, badminton court, and other facilities. There is also an 80-year-old sports club, Summair Sports Club, built by the erstwhile rulers of Jamnagar. It has a swimming pool, tennis, squash, and badminton courts, a billiard hall, a table tennis facility, and a hotel.

Parks and recreation

Museums 
The Kotha Bastion museum contains sculptures, coins, inscriptions, copper plates, and the skeleton of a whale. The museum also has an old well where water is drawn by blowing into a small hole in the floor.

The Lakhota Museum is in the former Lakhota Palace. This small museum has a collection of sculptures from the 9th to the 18th centuries, antique weapons, and pottery found in medieval villages from the surrounding area.

Parks and gardens

Bhuchar Mori Shahid Van 

The place is known for the Battle of Bhuchar Mori. It has a memorial site and park with a large garden, a play area for children, a small artificial climbing mountain, and a hut-like structure for picnics. The site has a memorial stone to Ajaji, a horse-mounted idol. There are wall sculptures representing the war fought between the army of Kathiawar (Nawanagar State) and the Mughal army in July 1591.

Gulab Kunvarbaa Udhyan 
Gulab Kunvarbaa Udhyan is a botanical garden across from the palace ground.

Jam Ranjitsinhji Park 
The Municipal Corporation of Jamnagar has recently developed Jam Ranjitsinhji Park near Ranjit Sagar Dam. The park has a garden with colourful fountains. There are also rides for children.

Marine National Park 

Marine National Park on the Gulf of Kutch is India's first marine sanctuary. The area attracts birds, dolphins, finless porpoises, sea turtles, and tropical fish.

Sardar Patel Amusement Park 
Sardar Patel Amusement Park was developed by Jamnagar Municipal Corporation(JMC). Its biggest attractions are a musical dancing fountain, a rain dance fountain for children, a dance hall for youths, a hall for Yoga, and a small auditorium. It also has a variety of rides, garden spaces, and a game arcade zone.

Sonapuri 
Surrounded by a park, the building has statues and murals depicting the story of Ramayana and various gods, goddesses, and saints. Near the pyres, the installation "Sansar Chakra" illustrates the stages of life.

Education 
Jamnagar has many private and government-granted schools, including Jawahar Navodaya Vidyalaya; Podar International School; St. Xavier's High School, Jamnagar; Shree Shastri Tryambakram High School; Shri D.C.C. Vividh Lakshi High School; St. Ann's High School; and St. Mary's High School, Jamnagar;  Delhi Public School,Jamnagar .

Engineering colleges in the city include Kalyan Polytechnic Institute, Krishna Institute of Engineering Technology, and Shree Kankeshwari Deviji Institute of Technology. Jamnagar also has dental and health colleges, including M. P. Shah Medical College and Gujarat Ayurved University, Indian Institute of Ayurved Pharmaceutical Sciences, Shree Gulabkunverba Ayurved Mahavidyalaya, and the Government Dental College & Hospital Jamnagar. There are several colleges for arts, commerce, and science.

Dhanvantri Mandir was built under the supervision of Dr. Pranjivan Manekchand Mehta, chief medical officer of Guru Govindsingh Hospital. After independence, it gained the status of Ayurveda University. It has a library and workshops and has been a place for research and international seminars on Ayurveda, an ancient Indian medicinal system.

Infrastructure

Transportation

Public transportation 
There are many private bus service providers with coaches running between Jamnagar and Bhuj, Ahmedabad, Surat, Vadodara, Mumbai, Pune, and other major cities. State Transport has bus services to almost all cities of Gujarat State and interstate transport facilities. The Jamnagar Municipal Corporation runs local buses. Also, Ola Cabs and auto rickshaws are available.

Rail 
Jamnagar has a railway station connected with a variety of India's destinations. Four daily trains go to Mumbai and weekly trains to the major cities to the north, east, and south of the country.

Airport 
The city has an airport with a daily direct flight to Mumbai and thrice-in-a-week flights to Hyderabad and Bengaluru. The airport is within a military enclave of the Indian Air Force.

Utilities 
The Sikka Thermal Power Station is a coal-fired power station near Jamnagar. Various cable operators like GTPL are available in the city, along with DTH services from Tata Play, Airtel, DishTV, and Videocon D2H. Bharat Sanchar Nigam Limited (BSNL) provides broadband. Reliance has started its 4G service, Reliance Jio. All mobile operators are available in Jamnagar, including Vi, Airtel,  Reliance, BSNL.

Media 
All India Radio airs at 100.1 MHz. Top FM airs at 91.9 MHz. Radio Mirchi airs at 95 MHz.

Daily local and national newspapers are available in Jamnagar in multiple languages, including The Times of India, Economic Times, Indian Express, and Business Standard. Local newspapers published in Gujarati include Aajkaal, Bhoomi, Jamnagar Bhaskar, Khabar Gujarat, Lokwat, and Nobat. The Princely State is the local English language newspaper.

Notable people 

The following individuals were born or have lived in Jamnagar:

 Ruskin Bond, author
 Remo D'Souza, dancer, choreographer, actor, and film director
 Indrajitsinhji, test cricketer
 Ajay Jadeja, former ODI cricketer
 Rajendrasinhji Jadeja, first Chief of Army Staff
 Ravindra Jadeja, Indian cricketer
 Vinoo Mankad, former test cricketer
 Ranjitsinhji, former test cricketer and the namesake of the Ranji Trophy
 Digvijaysinhji Ranjitsinhji, Jam Sahib of Nawanagar, also known as The Good Maharaja

See also 

 Amrapur-A village in Janmagar

References

External links 

 Birds picture and information in Jamnagar
 NavaNagarNa NarBanka and RajSattaNa Rang – Books exploring History of Jamnagar

Jamnagar
Former capital cities in India
Populated places established in 1540